The Cobourg Cougars are a junior ice hockey team from Cobourg, Ontario, Canada.  They are a part of the East division of the Ontario Junior Hockey League, a member of the Canadian Junior Hockey League. The Cougars won the 2017 Royal Bank Cup national junior A championship.

History
The Cougars spent time in the Eastern Junior "B" league and the Central Junior C Hockey League before jumping to the Central Junior "B" league in 1992.  The team graduated to Junior "A" when the league became the OPJHL the next season.

In the summer of 2010, the Cobourg Cougars absorbed the Bowmanville Eagles.  This move eliminated their local competition for players and local fan base.  In March 2011, the Cougars also absorbed the Streetsville Derbys. The Cougars were chosen to host the 2017 Royal Bank Cup.

Season-by-season results

Royal Bank Cup
CANADIAN NATIONAL CHAMPIONSHIPS
Dudley Hewitt Champions - Central, Fred Page Champions - Eastern, Western Canada Cup Champions - Western & Runner Up, and Host
Round robin play with top 4 in semi-final and winners to finals.

Clarence Schmalz Cup appearances
1972: Leamington Flyers defeated Cobourg Cougars 4-games-to-1
1974: Cobourg Cougars defeated Simcoe Jets 4-games-to-1

Notable alumni
Dennis O'Brien
Justin Williams
Randy Jones
Mason Marchment
Justin Danforth
Riley Stillman

External links
Cobourg Cougars

Ontario Provincial Junior A Hockey League teams
Cobourg
1964 establishments in Ontario
Ice hockey clubs established in 1964